The Khroma is a river in the Sakha Republic (Yakutia) of the Russian Federation.

Course
The source of the Khroma is at the confluence of the Tamteken and the Nemalak-Arangas, flowing down from the Polousny Range. It crosses the Yana-Indigirka Lowland, part of the greater East Siberian Lowland. It flows across the tundra roughly northeastwards and finally it has its mouth west of the mouth of the Lapcha in Khroma Bay which is connected with the East Siberian Sea. Owing to its extreme northerly location the Khroma River freezes up in early October and remains icebound until June.

Tributaries  

Wetlands
The Kytalyk Wetlands, located between the Khroma and the Sundrun (Khroma-Sundrun Interfluvial Area) is an ecologically important area, providing a favorable habitat for many rare animals. The region is practically uninhabited and full of lakes and marshes. Wild reindeer, Siberian cranes, Canadian cranes, marsh sandpipers and Ross's gulls are abundant in the Khroma River wetlands.

The lesser white-fronted goose, brent goose, Bewick's swan and the spectacled eider are also found in the Khroma-Sundrun Interfluvial Area.

Gold and tin mining upriver are affecting the ecology of the region by destroying fish and bird habitat.

See also
List of rivers of Russia

References

External links
Geographical data
Tourist information
Siberian Cranes

Rivers of the Sakha Republic
Drainage basins of the East Siberian Sea
East Siberian Lowland